The 28th Robert Awards ceremony was held on 6 February 2011 in Copenhagen, Denmark. Organized by the Danish Film Academy, the awards honoured the best in Danish and foreign film of 2010.

Honorees

Best Danish Film 
 R

Best Children's Film 
 Hold om mig - Kaspar Munk

Best Director 
 Tobias Lindholm & Michael Noer – R

Best Screenplay 
 Tobias Lindholm & Michael Noer – R

Best Actor in a Leading Role 
 Pilou Asbæk – R

Best Actress in a Leading Role 
 Trine Dyrholm – Hævnen

Best Actor in a Supporting Role 
 Peter Plauborg – Submarino

Best Actress in a Supporting Role 
 Bodil Jørgensen – Smukke mennesker

Best Production Design 
 Torben Stig Nielsen – Submarino

Best Cinematography 
 Magnus Nordenhof Jønck – R

Best Costume Design 
 Margrethe Rasmussen – Submarino

Best Makeup 
 Niamh Morrison – Valhalla Rising

Best Editing 
  – R

Best Sound Design 
 Morten Green – R

Best Score 
 Thomas Blachman & Kristian Eidnes Andersen – Submarino

Best Song 
 Agnes Obel – "Riverside" – Submarino

Best Special Effects 
 Morten Jacobsen & Thomas Foldberg – R

Best Short Fiction/Animation 
 To venner – Paw Charlie Ravn

Best Long Fiction/Animation 
 Limboland – Jeremy Weller

Documentary Short 
 Fini – Jacob Secher Schulsinger

Best Documentary Feature 
 Armadillo – Janus Metz

Best American Film 
 Inception – Christopher Nolan

Best Non-American Film 
 An Education – Lone Scherfig

Audience Award 
 Klown

See also 

 2011 Bodil Awards

References

External links 
  
 Robert-nomineringer 2011@dfi.dk 

2010 film awards
Robert Awards ceremonies
2011 in Copenhagen
February 2011 events in Europe